2017–18 Malaysia Purple League (also known as SS Purple League for sponsorship reasons) is the fourth edition of Malaysia Purple League. It started on 18 December 2017 and will conclude on 11 February 2018. 2018 edition will features new format. It will consist of 28 league ties (each tie consisting of 5 matches) in Stage 1. Top six teams in Stage 1, then progressing to the Stage 2 (divided into 2 groups) to accumulates points. Finals stage featuring all six teams will be drawn accordingly to the overall accumulated points.

Squads

Stage 1

Standings

Fixtures

Round-robin

Source: BAM TS website

7th-8th place playoff

Stage 2

Overall standings

Fixtures

Finals stage

Final standings

References

External links
 Tournament Link

Malaysia Purple League
Malaysia Purple League
Malaysia Purple League
Malaysia Purple League
Badminton tournaments in Malaysia